The Mana is a river in western French Guiana. It runs north from central French Guiana to the town of Mana, where it flows into the Atlantic Ocean.

References

Rivers of French Guiana
Rivers of France